Waa Wei (born 10 October 1982) is a Taiwanese singer-songwriter, radio DJ, author, actress and artist. She was the former lead vocalist of the indie band Natural Q. She has published seven solo albums: La Dolce Vita in 2007, Graceful Porcupine in 2010, No Crying in 2012, You Lovely Bastard in 2014, Run! Frantic Flowers! in 2016, Hidden, Not Forgotten in 2019, and Have a Nice Day in 2021. She also appeared in the 2021 film The Falls.

Discography

Studio albums

Extended plays

Singles

Live albums

Natural Q

As Radio DJ
She is a radio DJ of Hit FM (Taiwan), OH Night DJ(OH夜DJ) from 21:00 to 23:00 every weekday.

Theatre credits
Turn Left, Turn Right. Love, Or Regret, Miss Left,Taipei Cultural Center, 2013–2015, 2016

Awards and nominations

Natural Q

Solo

References

1982 births
Living people
21st-century Taiwanese singers
Taiwanese singer-songwriters
Mandopop singer-songwriters
Taiwanese radio presenters
Taiwanese women radio presenters
21st-century Taiwanese women singers